Matjaž Šinkovec (born on 22 May 1951) is a Slovenian diplomat, politician, translator, journalist and science fiction writer. He was one of the co-founders of the Slovenian Democratic Party.

Early life and career 
Šinkovec was born in a middle class family in Ljubljana, then part of the Socialist Federal Republic of Yugoslavia.
He attended the Poljane Grammar School in Ljubljana, where he was also classmate of the later historian and politician Vasko Simoniti. He enrolled at the University of Ljubljana, where he graduated from comparative linguistics. In 1976 he obtained his MA in English language and literature.

In 1974, he got employed as journalist in the daily newspaper Delo, but soon quit in disaccordance of its editorial policy. For the following years, he could not get a regular job due to his openly critical stance towards the Titoist regime. He earned his living as a freelance translator and author of science fiction short stories. Among others, he translated novels by Agatha Christie and Kurt Vonnegut into Slovene. In 1978, he was employed as an official translator in the Secretary for Foreign Cooperation of the Socialist Republic of Slovenia. In 1984, he started working at the Confederation of Independent Trade Unions of Slovenia, becoming one of the closest collaborators of its chairman France Tomšič who aimed at transforming the Confederation into a politically independent trade union, akin to the Polish Solidarity.

Early political activity 
In 1989, he was one of the co-founders of the Slovenian Social Democratic Party, together with France Tomšič and Jože Pučnik. A strong supporter of the unification of all democratic political forces in Slovenia against in opposition to the ruling Communist Party, he is considered to be the author of the name of the DEMOS coalition, founded in December 1989 as a common electoral platform of five largest Slovenian opposition parties. In the first democratic elections in 1990, Šinkovec was elected as an MP on the list of his Social Democratic Party.

Between 1990 and 1992, he served as the leader of the parliamentary group of the Social Democratic Party of Slovenia and as president of the Parliamentary Committee for Foreign Affairs. Between 1991 and 1992, he was the chief negotiator for independent Slovenia on the International Conference on former Yugoslavia led by lord Carrington. In the same period, he also served as head of the first Slovenian delegation to the Parliamentary Assembly of the Council of Europe.

Diplomatic career and return to politics 

After 1992, Šinkovec entered the diplomatic service. Between 1992 and 1997, he served as the first Slovenian ambassador to the United Kingdom. In 1997 he took over the sector of security policy in the Slovenian Foreign Ministry. In 1999 he became the permanent representative of Slovenia to NATO and in 2004.

In April 2006, he was appointed as the head of the Slovenian Intelligence and Security Agency. As chairman of the Agency, Šinkovec carried out several investigation on the activities of the Secret Service during the decade of centre-left governments, with an emphasis on the abuses of the Secret Service for political purposes. In 2007, he was relieved from office and appointed as a personal advisor of prime minister Janez Janša.

See also 
Foreign relations of Slovenia
Politics of Slovenia

References

External links 
NATO Who's Who.
Video profile on the webportal 24ur.com

Diplomats from Ljubljana
Slovenian Democratic Party politicians
Politicians from Ljubljana
Slovenian translators
English–Slovene translators
Journalists from Ljubljana
Ambassadors of Slovenia to the United Kingdom
Permanent Representatives of Slovenia to NATO
Living people
1951 births
University of Ljubljana alumni